Salvatore Ronald Matano (born September 15, 1946) is an American prelate of the Roman Catholic Church, serving as bishop of the Diocese of Rochester in Upstate New York since 2013. Matano previously served as Bishop of Burlington in Vermont from 2005 to 2013.

Biography

Early life
Salvatore Matano was born on September 15, 1946, in Providence, Rhode Island to Salvatore and Mary (née Santaniello) Matano. He attended La Salle Academy in Providence and Our Lady of Providence Seminary College, where he obtained his Bachelor of Philosophy degree.

Priesthood
Matano was ordained into the priesthood for the Diocese of Providence by Bishop James Hickey on December 17, 1971, in St. Peter's Basilica in Rome. In 1972, Matano received his Licentiate of Sacred Theology from the Pontifical Gregorian University in Rome.

Matano served as assistant pastor in Johnston, Rhode Island, from 1972 to 1973 and as a professor at Our Lady of Providence Seminary High School from 1972 to 1977. In 1977, he became the director of priest personnel for the Diocese of Providence. In 1980, Matano was named diocesan assistant chancellor. 

Matano returned to Rome for graduate studies. receiving his Doctor of Canon Law degree in 1983.  After returning to Providence, he served as vicar for administration and co-chancellor.  He was raised to the rank of honorary prelate by the Vatican in 1985. In 1991, Matano was named secretary to the apostolic nuncio of the United States, Archbishop Agostino Cacciavillan in Washington, D.C. In 1992, Matano was named vicar general and moderator of the curia for the Diocese of Providence. He was designated by the Vatican as protonotary apostolic in 1993.

In 1995, Matano became a special lecturer for undergraduate and graduate students in the Department of Theology at Providence College. In 1997, Matano gave up his positions in the church hierarchy to become a parish priest at St. Sebastian's Parish in Providence. In January 2000, Matano was named secretary to the new apostolic nuncio of the United States, Archbishop Gabriel Higuera.

Bishop of Burlington

On March 3, 2005, Matano was appointed coadjutor bishop of the Diocese of Burlington by Pope John Paul II. He received his episcopal consecration on April 19, 2005, from Archbishop Higuera, with Archbishop Seán O'Malley and Bishop Kenneth Angell serving as co-consecrators. Matano succeeded Angell as the ninth bishop of Burlington on November 9, 2005. In December 2008, Matano attended a trial in Burlington in order to hear about unresolved clerical abuse cases that occurred within the diocese in the 1970's.

Bishop of Rochester
On November 6, 2013, Pope Francis named Matano to succeed Bishop Matthew H. Clark as bishop of the Diocese of Rochester. Matano's installation took place on January 3, 2014. On August 18, 2018, Matano sent a letter to all parishioners in the diocese, expressing his outrage on the sexual abuse of children and young adults by diocese priests:"I cannot express adequately my sorrow for the pain, suffering and turmoil endured by the victims of child sexual abuse, especially when it is committed by the very ones who were so trusted and so grievously betrayed that very trust."On September 1, 2019 Matano returned to St. Augustine’s Parish in Providence, where he had served as a priest.  He celebrated the 9:30 am Mass with parishioners. In July, 2021, Matano attended a forum in Auburn, New York, for parishioners who were concerned about plans to close four churches in that city.  He made this statement: "As has been mentioned tonight, we are like a family. But how many times do families have to make sacrifices?"  Matano currently sits on the board of trustees of St. John's Seminary in Boston.

On August 31, 2021, Matano announced that he would be submitting a resignation letter to Francis in line with the mandatory retirement age of 75 for bishops.  As of February 2023, his successor had not been appointed.

See also

Catholic Church hierarchy
Catholic Church in the United States
Historical list of the Catholic bishops of the United States
List of Catholic bishops of the United States
Lists of patriarchs, archbishops, and bishops

References

External links
Roman Catholic Diocese of Rochester Official Site

Episcopal succession

1946 births
Living people
21st-century Roman Catholic bishops in the United States
Clergy from Providence, Rhode Island
Providence College faculty
Roman Catholic Diocese of Providence
Roman Catholic Diocese of Rochester
Roman Catholic bishops of Burlington
Pontifical Gregorian University alumni
Religious leaders from Rhode Island
Religious leaders from New York (state)
La Salle Academy alumni